Wallenstam AB (publ) is a Swedish property company based in Gothenburg. Established in 1944, the company is listed on Nasdaq Stockholm, Large Cap.

In addition to its home city of Gothenburg, the company also operates in Stockholm, Uppsala and Helsingborg.

External links
Official Website

Property management companies
Real estate companies of Sweden
Companies based in Gothenburg
Real estate companies established in 1944
1944 establishments in Sweden
Companies listed on Nasdaq Stockholm